The Stroud Sleeman Cashspiel is an annual bonspiel, or curling tournament. It takes place at the Stroud Curling Club in Stroud, Ontario. The tournament has been held as part of the men's and women's Ontario Curling Tour, and included on the World Curling Tour from 2013 to 2019.

Past champions
''Only skip's name is displayed.

Men

Women

References

External links

Ontario Curling Tour events
Sport in Simcoe County